is a Noh play by Zeami about the famous poet Saigyō, regarding his well-known love for cherry blossoms.

Background
Saigyō was renowned for his love of the flowering cherry - what he himself once called "my lifelong habit of having my mind immersed in blossoms".

As a recluse however, he sometimes found himself in conflict with the Japanese habit of collective blossom viewing: as he wrote in his Sankashū, "Leave me in solitude/O Cherry flowers./Draw  not people,/for they come in crowds".

Plot
Wishing to be alone with his cherry-blossoms, Saigyō is annoyed by the arrival of a party of (potential) viewers; and, on admitting them, composes a waka blaming the cherry tree for their intrusive presence.

That night he is visited by the spirit of the cherry-tree, who rebukes him by pointing out the separateness and independence of all living creatures from human concerns. The two then converse, before the play ends with an extensive dance celebrating cherry flowers, exceptional sakura sites like Kiyomizu-dera, and the transient beauty of Spring.

See also
Eguchi (play)
The Priest and the Willow

Further reading
Twelve Plays of the Noh and Kyôgen Theatres, Karen Brazell (ed.) 1988

References

External links 
 Saigyo in three Japanese No plays

Noh
Noh plays